Joe Zen Robert Bell (born 27 April 1999) is a New Zealand professional footballer who plays as a defensive midfielder for Danish Superliga club Brøndby IF and the New Zealand national team.

Early and personal life
Bell was born in Bristol, England but holds dual citizenship. He was raised in Wānaka and Christchurch, attendingMedbury School  and Christ's College, Christchurch before moving aged 15 to Wellington to attend Scots College and play for the Phoenix.

He started playing football as an eight-year-old for Ferrymead Bays.

Club career

Wellington Phoenix Reserves
Bell moved to Wellington to join the Wellington Phoenix Academy under the guidance of Jess Ibrom where he started playing for the Wellington Phoenix Reserves in the New Zealand Football Championship for the 2014–15 season, playing 12 games with four starts. He played for the reserves for another two seasons, appearing 14 times in the 2015–16 season with 10 starts and eight times with six starts in the 2016–17 season. With the New Zealand football championship played over the summer, Bell played for Wellington United in the Central League during the winter.

Virginia Cavaliers
Bell joined the Virginia Cavaliers who play in the NCAA Division I in the Atlantic Coast Conference. Bell started 55 straight games since joining the University. He scored six goals and had ten assists across three seasons, while also spending time with amateur club Charlottesville Alliance during the 2018 NPSL season.

Following his successful FIFA U-20 World Cup campaign, Bell drew the interest of several European sides, trialing with Eliteserien side Viking and eventually being offered a contract. However, with the University of Virginia offering him a full scholarship at year's end, Bell decided to delay going professional to get his degree.

Bell had a successful 2019 season with the Cavaliers as co-captain of the team which won the ACC Coastal Division and won the ACC men's tournament for the first time since 2009. The team ended the season winning 21 games, which was one shy of a school record. The Cavaliers entered the 2019 NCAA Tournament as the No. 1 seed. After wins over Campbell, St. John's, SMU and Wake Forest, Virginia lost in the final to Georgetown finishing runner up for the second time in school history. Bell ended the season playing 21 games of which he started all 21 of them, only missing two games during the ACC tournament while on International duty. He scored seven goals, of which four came during the NCAA tournament, as well as had four assists.

Bell also won a number of awards both on the field and academic, including United Soccer Coaches Scholar Player of the Year, First Team Scholar All-American, ACC First Team and ACC Midfielder of the Year He was also one of three finalists for the MAC Hermann Trophy for best player in the country.

Viking
On 10 January 2020, Bell signed a three-year contract with Viking in the Norwegian Eliteserien.

Brøndby IF
On transfer-deadline day, 31 January 2022, Bell signed a 4½-year contract with reigning Danish Superliga champions Brøndby IF.

International career

U17
Bell was selected for the New Zealand U17 national team that played in the 2015 FIFA U-17 World Cup in Chile. He played in two of the group games, a 0–0 draw with Syria and a 2–1 win over Paraguay. As well as there loss to Brazil in the Round of 16 with a stoppage-time penalty seeing them eliminated from the competition.

U20
Bell has played for and captained the New Zealand U20 national team. Playing in the 2018 OFC U-19 Championship where he was the tournament MVP and they qualified for the 2019 FIFA U-20 World Cup in Poland. He has also played and captained the team at the 2017 FIFA U-20 World Cup in South Korea.

Senior
Bell made his team debut for the New Zealand senior national team in a friendly against Ireland, starting in a 3–1 loss.

Career statistics

Club

International

Scores and results list New Zealand's goal tally first, score column indicates score after each Bell goal.

Honours
New Zealand U19
 OFC U-19 Championship: 2018
 2018 OFC U-19 Championship Golden Ball

Individual
 All-ACC Team Awards – Freshman Team 2017, Third Team 2018, First Team 2019 and ACC Midfielder of the Year: 2019
 TopDrawerSoccer.com National Player of the Year Award: 2019
 Soccer America Player of the Year Award: 2019

References

External links

1999 births
Living people
All-American men's college soccer players
Footballers from Bristol
People from Wānaka
New Zealand association footballers
New Zealand international footballers
New Zealand under-20 international footballers
New Zealand youth international footballers
English footballers
English emigrants to New Zealand
Association football midfielders
Wellington Phoenix FC players
Virginia Cavaliers men's soccer players
Viking FK players
Brøndby IF players
Eliteserien players
Danish Superliga players
People educated at Scots College, Wellington
New Zealand expatriate association footballers
New Zealand expatriate sportspeople in the United States
Expatriate soccer players in the United States
New Zealand expatriate sportspeople in Norway
Expatriate footballers in Norway
New Zealand expatriate sportspeople in Denmark
Expatriate men's footballers in Denmark
Footballers at the 2020 Summer Olympics
Olympic association footballers of New Zealand
National Premier Soccer League players